Haugen is a Norwegian surname and place name frequently used for farm homesteads. Haugen  derives from the old Norse word haugr meaning tiny hill, small grassy knoll, or mound. Derivatives also include the Norwegian surnames Haugan and Hauge. 

Haugen can refer to:

People
Haugen (surname)

Places
United States
 Haugen Township, Aitkin County, Minnesota
 Haugen, Wisconsin

Other
Båthaugen  - Site of the Tune ship in Rolvsøy in Tune, Østfold, Norway 
Borrehaugene - Norwegian national park in Horten, Vestfold, Norway
Flagghaugen - Avaldsnes burial site on Karmøy in Rogaland, Norway
Gamlehaugen - Mansion in Bergen, Norway and residence of the Norwegian Royal Family in the city
Gokstadhaugen - Burial mound in Sandefjord, Vestfold, Norway
Haraldshaugen - Norwegian national monument in Haugesund, Norway
Karnilshaugen - Site of Karnils burial mound in Gloppen, Sogn og Fjordane, Norway
Maihaugen - Large open-air museum located in Lillehammer, Norway
Oseberghaugen -  Viking era grave site located in Tønsberg, Norway
St. Hanshaugen Park - Public park in Oslo, Norway
Tinghaugen - Site of an early Norwegian court in Frosta, Nord-Trøndelag, Norway
Troldhaugen  - Residence of Edvard Grieg in Bergen, Norway
Trollhaugen - a ski resort in Dresser, Wis.

See also

 
 Haugan (disambiguation)
 Hauge (disambiguation)
 Haugr